Astral Traveling is the debut album by keyboardist Lonnie Liston Smith, featuring performances recorded in 1973 and released by the Flying Dutchman label.

Reception

Reviewer Alex Henderson stated on AllMusic " this LP leaves no doubt that the improviser is very much his own man and has a wealth of brilliant ideas of his own; thankfully, he has a cohesive band to help him carry them out ... Astral Traveling is among Smith's most essential and rewarding albums".

Track listing
All compositions by Lonnie Liston Smith
 "Astral Traveling" − 5:30
 "Let Us Go Into the House of the Lord" − 6:30
 "Rejuvenation" − 5:50
 "I Mani (Faith)" − 6:10
 "In Search of Truth" − 7:04
 "Aspirations" − 4:20

Personnel
Lonnie Liston Smith − piano, electric piano
George Barron − soprano saxophone, tenor saxophone
Joe Beck − guitar
Cecil McBee − bass
David Lee Jr. − drums
James Mtume, Sonny Morgan − congas, percussion 
Badal Roy − tabla
Geeta Vashi − tamboura

References

1973 albums
Albums produced by Bob Thiele
Flying Dutchman Records albums
Lonnie Liston Smith albums
Spiritual jazz albums